The 2023 season is St Patrick's Athletic F.C.'s 94th year in existence and is the Supersaint's 72nd consecutive season in the top-flight of Irish football. It is the second season in charge for manager Tim Clancy, having taken over from Stephen O'Donnell in December 2021. Pre-season training for the squad began in January 2023. The fixtures were released on 15 December 2022, with Pat's down to play the previous season's runners up Derry City at home on the opening night of the season. In addition to the league the club will also compete in the FAI Cup, the UEFA Europa Conference League and the Leinster Senior Cup.

Squad

Transfers

Transfers in

Transfers out

Squad statistics

Appearances, goals and cards
Number in brackets represents (appearances of which were substituted ON).
Last updated – 17 March 2023

Top scorers
Includes all competitive matches.
Last updated 17 March 2023

Top assists
Includes all competitive matches.
Last updated 17 March 2023

Top clean sheets
Includes all competitive matches.
Last updated 17 March 2023

Disciplinary record
Last updated 17 March 2023

Captains

Club

Coaching staff

First-team manager: Tim Clancy
Assistant manager: Jon Daly
Technical director: Alan Mathews
Director of football: Ger O'Brien
Coach: Seán O'Connor
Opposition analyst: Martin Doyle
Goalkeeping coach: Pat Jennings
Strength and conditioning coach: Chris Colburn
Head of medical: Sam Rice
Club doctor: Dr Matt Corcoran
Physiotherapist: Christy O'Neill
Equipment manager: David McGill
Academy director: Ger O'Brien
Assistant academy director: Jamie Moore
Academy lead strength and conditioning coach: Seán Fogarty
Head of academy medical: David Mugalu
Head of academy recruitment: Ian Cully
Head of academy data: Phil Power
Under 19s manager: Seán O'Connor
Under 19s assistant manager: Niall Cully
Under 19s coach: Paul Webb
Under 19s goalkeeping coach: Seán Fogarty
Under 17s manager: John Donohue
Under 17s goalkeeping coach: Seán Fogarty
Under 15s manager: Alan Brady
Under 15s assistant manager: Willie Tyrell
Under 15s coach: Ciarán Creagh
Under 15s goalkeeping coach: Jamie Quinn
Under 14s manager: Mark Connolly
Under 14s assistant manager: Dan Tannim
Under 14s goalkeeping coach: Alex Regan

Kit

|
|
|
|
|
|}

The club released new Home, Away & Third kits for the season.

Key:LOI=League of Ireland Premier DivisionFAI=FAI CupUEC=UEFA Europa Conference LeagueLSC=Leinster Senior CupFRN=Friendly

Competitions

League of Ireland

League table

Results summary

Results by round

Matches

FAI Cup

First round

UEFA Europa Conference League

First Qualifying Round

Leinster Senior Cup

Fourth round

Friendlies

Pre-season

References

2023
2023 League of Ireland Premier Division by club